Areyongalepis is a genus of prehistoric jawless fish that lived during the Ordovician period.

The genus was originally named Areyonga by Australian palaeontologist Gavin C. Young, but the name had already been allocated to a modern genus of wasp.  Young therefore renamed the fossil fish Areyongalepis in 2000.

References

Ordovician jawless fish
Prehistoric jawless fish genera